Segunda División (Spanish for Second Division) can refer to: 

CONMEBOL (South America)
Primera B Nacional, Argentina 
Primera B Boliviana, de Bolivia 
Primera B Chilena, de Chile 
Categoría Primera B, de Colombia
Ecuadorian Serie B, de Ecuador 
Paraguayan Segunda División, Paraguay 
Peruvian Segunda División, Peru
Uruguayan Segunda División, Uruguay
Venezuelan Segunda División, Venezuela
CONCACAF (Central and North America)
Segunda División de Costa Rica, Costa Rica
Segunda División de El Salvador, El Salvador
Segunda División de México, Mexico
Segunda División de Nicaragua, Nicaragua
UEFA (Europe)
Segunda División, Spain
Segunda División B, Spain
Segunda División (women), Spain

See also 
Primera División